Uder is a Verwaltungsgemeinschaft ("collective municipality") in the district Eichsfeld, in Thuringia, Germany. The seat of the Verwaltungsgemeinschaft is in Uder.

The Verwaltungsgemeinschaft Uder consists of the following municipalities:

 Asbach-Sickenberg 
 Birkenfelde 
 Dietzenrode-Vatterode 
 Eichstruth 
 Lenterode 
 Lutter 
 Mackenrode 
 Röhrig 
 Schönhagen 
 Steinheuterode 
 Thalwenden 
 Uder 
 Wüstheuterode

References

Verwaltungsgemeinschaften in Thuringia